Stigmella maytenivora is a moth of the family Nepticulidae. It was described by Gustafsson in 1985. It is found in Gambia.

The larvae feed on Maytenus sengalensis. They probably mine the leaves of their host plant.

References

Nepticulidae
Moths described in 1985
Endemic fauna of the Gambia
Moths of Africa